Paul Lucier (July 29, 1930 – July 23, 1999) was a Canadian businessman and Senator.

Born in LaSalle, Ontario, the son of Adolph Lucier and Claire Laframboise, he was appointed by Pierre Trudeau the first Senator representing the senatorial division of Yukon in 1975. Sitting as a Liberal, he served until his death in 1999.

On arrival in the Yukon, he served as a deckhand on the SS Klondike, one of the few still operating river steamers.  He later also served as a city councillor for Whitehorse City Council in Whitehorse, Yukon for several years, including serving as mayor in 1974–75.

He died in Penticton, British Columbia in 1999.

References

External links
 

1930 births
1999 deaths
Liberal Party of Canada senators
Canadian senators from Yukon
Mayors of Whitehorse
Yukon Liberal Party politicians
Franco-Ontarian people
Franco-Yukonnais people